The 1990–91 I-Divisioona season was the 17th season of the I-Divisioona, the second level of Finnish ice hockey. 12 teams participated in the league, and JoKP Joensuu won the championship and was promoted to the SM-liiga. Kärpät Oulu finished second and was able to participate in the promotion/relegation round of the SM-liiga.

Regular season

External links 
Season on eliteprospects.com

2
Fin
I-Divisioona seasons